Welcome Stranger is a 1924 American silent comedy-drama film directed by James Young, starring Florence Vidor and featuring Noah Beery.

Cast

Dore Davidson as Isadore Solomon
Florence Vidor as Mary Clark
Virginia Brown Faire as Essie Solomon
Noah Beery as Icahod Whitson
Lloyd Hughes as Ned Tyler
Robert Edeson as Eb Hooker
William V. Mong as Clem Beemis
Otis Harlan as Seth Trimble
Fred J. Butler as Gideon Tyler
Pat Hartigan as Detective
Evelyn Sherman as Dowager (uncredited)

Preervation
With no copies of Welcome Stranger located in any film archives, it is a lost film.

References

External links

Stills at silenthollywood.com

1924 films
Lost American films
American films based on plays
Films directed by James Young
American silent feature films
American black-and-white films
1920s English-language films
1924 comedy-drama films
1924 lost films
Lost comedy-drama films
1920s American films
Silent American comedy-drama films